Boissonneaua is a small genus of hummingbirds in the family Trochilidae. They are found in humid Andean forests from western Venezuela to southern Peru. They have a straight black bill, contrasting outer rectrices, and a distinctive habit of quickly lifting both wings up shortly after landing, thereby revealing their rufous underwing coverts.

Species
The genus contains three species:

References

 Restall, R., Rodner, C., & Lentino, M. (2006). Birds of Northern South America. Vol. 1 & 2. Helm, London.  (vol. 1);  (vol. 2).

 
Bird genera
Taxonomy articles created by Polbot
Taxa named by Ludwig Reichenbach